"Word Is Out" is a song written by English musical duo Stock and Waterman for Australian singer Kylie Minogue's fourth studio album, Let's Get to It (1991). Produced by Mike Stock and Pete Waterman, it was released as the first single from Let's Get to It on 26 August 1991. The artwork for the cover was photographed by Ellen Von Unwerth in 1991 for the British edition of Esquire.

Critical reception
Chris True from AllMusic chose the track as one of Let's Get to Its track picks. Larry Flick from Billboard commented, "Folks who think Kylie Minogue is too light for them may change their minds when they hear "Word Is Out". With a little help from remixer Tony King, she has eschewed the frothy hi-NRG tone of past hits in favor of an easy paced-house sound, replete with disco-flavored strings and percussion." On Michael Wilton's review of the second night of her Anti Tour in Sydney, Australia—where she performed an a cappella rendition of the song—for musicOMH, he stated that "Word is Out" is "wildly underrated." Writing Minogue's biography for her special on Australian music video program Rage, they stated: "While in the past, her material had always been high energy, 'Word Is Out' showcased a far more seductive side to Kylie that many had suspected was there." In another hand, Nick Griffiths from Select called it one of the "odd songs" in the album. Sophie Lawrence reviewed it for Smash Hits, writing, "Sounds like Madonna's La Isla Bonita a bit, doesn't it? She's just been brilliant ever since Better The Devil You Know. You could listen to this 100 times and never get bored."

Commercial performance
The song was released as the first single in the summer of 1991 and was a top-20 hit in the United Kingdom, reaching number 16 and ending Minogue's run of 13 consecutive UK top-10 hits. In Australia, with the more laid back Summer Breeze Mix as the main mix, it peaked at number 10, becoming Minogue's 10th single to chart within the top 10. The Summer Breeze Mix received a UK release on a one-sided limited edition 12-inch vinyl single that has an engraved autograph on the B-side, making it highly collectable for fans.

Music video
Directed by James Lebon, it was filmed in London's famous Camden market and featured British television presenter Davina McCall as one of Minogue's dancers. An Australian version of the video later appeared on her 2002 (also the updated version in 2003) Greatest Hits DVD as one of the bonus features.

Live performances
Minogue also did an a cappella "sing-along" rendition of the song as requested by fans on her Anti Tour's concert in Big Top at Luna Park, Sydney, Australia on 20 March 2012. musicOMH's Michael Wilton said the performance was "decent."
 Let's Get to It Tour
 Showgirl: The Homecoming Tour (Impromptu a capella performance during technical difficulties)
 Anti Tour (Acapella performance in Sydney)

Track listingsAustralian CD and cassette single "Word Is Out" – 3:41
 "Say the Word - I'll Be There" – 4:00
 "Word Is Out" (Summer Breeze 12-inch mix) – 7:41Australian 12-inch singleA1. "Word Is Out" (Summer Breeze 12-inch mix) – 7:41
A2. "Word Is Out" (instrumental) – 3:31
B1. "Word Is Out" (UK 12-inch mix) – 5:53
B2. "Say the Word - I'll Be There" – 4:00UK 7-inch and cassette single "Word Is Out" – 3:34
 "Say the Word - I'll Be There" – 4:00UK 12-inch singleA1. "Word Is Out" – 5:53
B1. "Say the Word - I'll Be There" – 4:00
B2. "Word Is Out" (instrumental) – 3:31UK and Japanese CD single'
 "Word Is Out" (7-inch version) – 3:34
 "Word Is Out" (12-inch version) – 5:53
 "Say the Word - I'll Be There" – 4:00

Charts

Weekly charts

Year-end charts

Release history

References

Kylie Minogue songs
1991 singles
1991 songs
Australian contemporary R&B songs
Mushroom Records singles
New jack swing songs
Pete Waterman Entertainment singles
Song recordings produced by Stock Aitken Waterman
Songs written by Mike Stock (musician)
Songs written by Pete Waterman